Section 8 or Section Eight may refer to:

Arts and entertainment
 Section 8 (album), by MC Eiht, 1999
 Section 8 (comics), a fictional team of superheroes 
 Section 8 (video game), 2009
 Section 8: Prejudice, a 2011 sequel
 Section Eight (Artemis Fowl), a fictional element in Artemis Fowl and the Lost Colony
 Section 8 (record producer), record producer and songwriter
 Section Eight (film), a 2022 American action film starring Ryan Kwanten
 "Section 8", a song by Whitechapel from the album Whitechapel

Businesses and organisations
 Section 8 (NYSPHSAA), governing body for high school sports in Nassau County, New York, U.S.
 Section 8 Chicago, the independent supporter's association for the Chicago Fire Soccer Club
 Section Eight Productions, a film production company

Other uses
 Section 8 (military), a United States military form of discharge
 Section 8 (housing), a U.S. government-funded housing program
 Section 8 notice, used in England and Wales and is part of the Housing Act 1988
 Section 8 of the Canadian Charter of Rights and Freedoms

See also

 Section.80 (album), by Kendrick Lamar, 2011